A bibliography of books and material related to the Architecture of Denmark:

General

Dirckinck-Holmfeld, Kim; Keiding, Martin; Amundsen, Marianne; Smidt, Claus M.: Danish architecture since 1754. Danish Architectural Press, 2007. 400p.
Faber, Tobias: A history of Danish architecture. Det Danske Selskab, Copenhagen, 1978. 316p.

Lind, Olaf: Architecture guide Danish islands. Copenhagen: Danish Architectural Press, 2007. 336p.

Ørum-Nielsen, Jørn: Dwelling. Danish Architectural Press (Copenhagen). 1966. 261p.

Sestoft, Jørgen; Hegner, Christiansen Jørgen; Guide to Danish architecture, 2 vols. Arkitektens Forlag, 1995. 272p.

Castles, palaces and houses

Churches

Museums

Other

Outstanding architects
Arne Jacobsen
Dyssegaard, Søren (ed.); Jacobsen, Arne; Skriver, Poul Erik: Arne Jacobsen, a Danish architect,  (translation: Reginald Spink and Bodil Garner), 1971, Copenhagen: Ministry of Foreign Affairs, 56 p. 
Jacobsen, Arne: Arne Jacobsen: absolutely modern, 2002, Humlebaek: Louisiana Museum of Modern Art, 96 p. 
Solaguren-Beascoa de Corral, Felix: Arne Jacobsen (Obras y Proyectos / Works and Projects), 1992, Barcelona, Editorial Gustavo Gili, 222 pages. 
Thau, Carsten; Vindum, Kjeld: Arne Jacobsen, 2008, Copenhagen, Arkitektens forlag, 560 p. 

Henning Larsen
Larsen, Henning, De skal sige tak. Kulturhistorisk testamente om Operaen (They wish to say thank you. Cultural comments about the Opera), People's Press 2009. 
	
Sten Møller, Henrik, Legen og lyset. En frise over Henning Larsen som menneske og arkitekt (Light and Life. A portrait of Henning Larsen as a person and an architect), Politikens Forlag 2000, 

Jørn Utzon
Keiding, Martin and Dirckinck-Holmfeld, Kim (ed.): Utzon and the new tradition, Utzon Library, Copenhagen, Danish Architectural Press, 2005, 262 pages. 
Keiding, Martin and Dirckinck-Holmfeld, Kim (ed.): Utzon's own houses, Utzon Library, Copenhagen, Danish Architectural Press, 2004. 
Utzon, Jørn: Additive Architecture: Logbook Vol. V, Copenhagen, Edition Bløndal, 2009, 312 pages. 
Utzon, Jørn: Bagsværd Church: Logbook Vol. II, Copenhagen, Edition Bløndal, 2005, 168 pages. 
Utzon, Jørn: Kuwait National Assembly: Logbook Vol. IV, Copenhagen, Edition Bløndal, 2008, 312 pages. 
Utzon, Jørn: Two Houses on Majorca: Logbook Vol. III, Copenhagen, Edition Bløndal, 2004, 76 pages. 
Utzon, Jørn: The Courtyard Houses: Logbook Vol. I, Copenhagen, Edition Bløndal, 2004, 180 pages. 
Utzon Jørn and Drew, Philip: Sydney Opera House, London, Phaidon Press, 1995, 60 pages.

Universities

Books about Denmark
Architecture books
Architecture in Denmark